D.L.F Public School is an educational institution in Sahibabad, in the Indian state of Uttar Pradesh. The school is recognized by the CBSE Board and the first ten students passed out in 2002 and twelve in 2004. The school offers education from the Pre-Nursery to XII classes. Since inception in 1996 by the Darbari Lal Foundation, it has grown from an 18-room building to a sprawling institution of five acres. The Darbari Lal Foundation also runs its sister school, DLF World School, in Greater Noida

Sports 
The school has a large variety of sports facilities-
 DLPS Sports Academy
 Cricket, Soccer, Football and Hockey fields
 Skating Rink
 Tennis, Basketball, Volleyball Courts  
 Yoga Room

Student Guild 
The school has a student leader body made up of two branches: The Executive Council, and the House Prefectural Boards. The EC is responsible for overall, school-wide affairs, with posts like School Captain, School Literary Captain, School Sports Captain, etc. The HPBs handle the events for their own respective houses. The school has the following four houses, named after planets, which students get admitted into from class IV:
Jupiter
Venus
Mars
Mercury

Management 
The school has a staff of 150 teachers, including 4 co-ordinators, one each for the Primary, Middle, Secondary, and Senior Secondary sections, and three overseeing leaders:

1) Ms. Seema Jerath, (Principal)

2) Dr. Rakesh Khullar, (Chairman)

3) Dr. Mrignaini, Executive Director and founding Principal.

Acclaim 
The school has been ranked No. 1 nation-wide by C-Fore for Leadership and Management quality. They have also been awarded the no. 1 rank nation-wide in Individual Attention to Students by EducationToday.Their current principal, Ms. Seema Jerath was awarded the National Award for Teachers in 2012 by then-president Pranab Mukherjee.

References

External links
 

1996 establishments in Uttar Pradesh
Education in Ghaziabad district, Uttar Pradesh
Educational institutions established in 1996
High schools and secondary schools in Uttar Pradesh
Primary schools in Uttar Pradesh